Brak Thiva (born 5 December 1998) is a Cambodian football player who plays for Phnom Penh Crown in the Cambodian League and also the Cambodia national team. He plays as an attacking midfielder for his club and national team.

Career statistics

Club

International 

International goals

Honours

Club
Phnom Penh Crown
Cambodian Premier League: 2021, 2022
Cambodian Super Cup: 2022
Cambodian League Cup: 2022

References

1998 births
Living people
Cambodian footballers
Cambodia international footballers
People from Koh Kong province
Association football midfielders
Phnom Penh Crown FC players
Competitors at the 2017 Southeast Asian Games
Southeast Asian Games competitors for Cambodia